Kullu is a town in Himachal Pradesh, India.

Kullu may also refer to:
 Kullu district
 Kullu language, the Indo-Aryan language spoken there
 Küllü, Ulus, a village in Bartın Province, Turkey
 Jyoti Sunita Kullu (born 1978), Indian field hockey player

See also 
 
 Kulu (disambiguation)
 Kallu (name)